FC Sportika is a Bulgarian women's football club from the city of Blagoevgrad.

It was founded in 2006 and currently competes in the Bulgarian women's football championship. The team finished in 2nd place in the 2012–13 season – their best position so far.

Notable former players
Players who played for FC Sportika Blagoevgrad and received recognition at full international level 
  Evdokiya Popadinova

References

Association football clubs established in 2006
Women's football clubs in Bulgaria
Football clubs in Blagoevgrad